Sangeetha Kalasikhamani or Sangita Kalasikhamani (from sangeetha = music, kala = art, sikhamaṇi = gem of a diadem or crest) is the title awarded yearly to an expert Carnatic musician by the Indian Fine Arts Society, Chennai.

List of Sangeetha Kalasikhamanis

References

External links 
 AWARDEES OF SANGEETHA KALASIKHAMANI

Indian music awards
Carnatic music
Year of establishment missing
Tamil Nadu awards